Aleksandr Stepanovich Viktorenko (born 29 March 1947) is a Soviet/Russian cosmonaut.

He was selected as a cosmonaut on March 23, 1978, and retired on May 30, 1997. During his active career he had been Commander of Soyuz TM-3, Soyuz TM-8, Soyuz TM-14 and Soyuz TM-20. He has spent a total of 489 days in space.

Honours and awards
 Hero of the Soviet Union
 Order of Merit for the Fatherland, 3rd class (10 April 1995) - for their courage and heroism displayed during prolonged space flight on the orbital scientific research complex Mir
 Order of Friendship of Peoples (11 August 1992) - for the successful implementation of long-duration space flight on the orbital station Mir and displaying courage and heroism
 Order of Lenin
 Order of the October Revolution (19 February 1990) - for the successful implementation of spaceflight on the orbital scientific research complex Mir and displaying courage and heroism
 Medal "For Merit in Space Exploration" (12 April 2011) - for the great achievements in the field of research, development and use of outer space, many years of diligent work, public activities
 Commander of the Legion of Honour (March 1999), previously an officer  (1988)
 Pilot-cosmonaut of the Soviet Union

References

1947 births
Living people
People from North Kazakhstan Region
Soviet cosmonauts
Russian cosmonauts
Heroes of the Soviet Union
Recipients of the Order "For Merit to the Fatherland", 3rd class
Recipients of the Order of Friendship of Peoples
Recipients of the Order of Lenin
Commandeurs of the Légion d'honneur
Recipients of the Medal "For Merit in Space Exploration"
Soviet Air Force officers
Russian Air Force officers
Spacewalkers
Mir crew members